Psalm 48 is the 48th psalm of the Book of Psalms, beginning in English in the King James Version: "Great is the LORD, and greatly to be praised in the city of our God". In the slightly different numbering system used in the Greek Septuagint version of the bible, and generally in its Latin translations, this psalm is Psalm 47. In the Vulgate, it begins "Magnus Dominus". The psalm was composed by the sons of Korah, as "a celebration of the security of Zion", In its heading it is referred to as both a "song" and a "psalm".

The psalm forms a regular part of Jewish, Catholic, Lutheran, Anglican and other Protestant liturgies, and has been set to music. Bach's 1729 cantata Gott, wie dein Name, so ist auch dein Ruhm, BWV 171, begins with verse 10 in German, and Penderecki's 1996 Symphony No. 7 begins with the first verse.

Text

Hebrew Bible version 
The following is the Hebrew text of Psalm 48:

King James Version 
 Great is the LORD, and greatly to be praised in the city of our God, in the mountain of his holiness.
 Beautiful for situation, the joy of the whole earth, is mount Zion, on the sides of the north, the city of the great King.
 God is known in her palaces for a refuge.
 For, lo, the kings were assembled, they passed by together.
 They saw it, and so they marvelled; they were troubled, and hasted away.
 Fear took hold upon them there, and pain, as of a woman in travail.
 Thou breakest the ships of Tarshish with an east wind.
 As we have heard, so have we seen in the city of the LORD of hosts, in the city of our God: God will establish it for ever. Selah.
 We have thought of thy lovingkindness, O God, in the midst of thy temple.
 According to thy name, O God, so is thy praise unto the ends of the earth: thy right hand is full of righteousness.
 Let mount Zion rejoice, let the daughters of Judah be glad, because of thy judgments.
 Walk about Zion, and go round about her: tell the towers thereof.
 Mark ye well her bulwarks, consider her palaces; that ye may tell it to the generation following.
 For this God is our God for ever and ever: he will be our guide even unto death.

Heading
The psalm is described initially as A Song. A Psalm of the sons of Korah.
Theologian Albert Barnes writes: "The two appellations, song and psalm, would seem to imply that it was intended to 'combine' what was implied in both these words; that is, that it embraced what was usually understood by the word psalm, and that it was intended also specifically to be sung.

Uses

Judaism
This psalm is the psalm of the day in the Shir Shel Yom for Monday.
Verse 2 is part of Mishnah Tamid 7:4.
Verse 12 is part of the blessings before the Shema.

New Testament 
In the New Testament, verse 2 of Psalm 48 is quoted in Matthew 5 .

Book of Common Prayer
In the Church of England's Book of Common Prayer, this psalm is appointed to be read on the evening of the ninth day of the month.

Musical settings 
Heinrich Schütz wrote a setting of a paraphrase of Psalm 48 in German, "Groß ist der Herr und hoch gepreist", SWV 145, for the Becker Psalter, published first in 1628. Magnus Dominus, in Latin, was set to music by François Giroust (1778), Charles Levens and Joseph Cassanéa de Mondonville (1734) and by Richard Smallwood (1992).

Bach's cantata Gott, wie dein Name, so ist auch dein Ruhm, BWV 171, begins with verse 10 in German.

Penderecki's 1996 Symphony No. 7, a choral symphony subtitled "The Seven Gates of Jerusalem", begins with the first verse.

References

External links 

 
 
 Text of Psalm 48 according to the 1928 Psalter
  in Hebrew and English - Mechon-mamre
 Psalm 48 – The City of the Great King text and detailed commentary, enduringword.com
 A psalm of the Korahites. Great is the LORD and highly praised in the city of our God text and footnotes, usccb.org United States Conference of Catholic Bishops
 Psalm 48:1 introduction and text, biblestudytools.com
 Psalm 48 / Refrain: We have waited on your loving-kindness, O God. Church of England
 Psalm 48 at biblegateway.com
 Hymns for Psalm 48 hymnary.org

048